Michael Brauer is an American mix engineer.

Career 
He received a Grammy for "Best Pop Vocal Album" for his work on John Mayer's Continuum, "Best Alternative Album" for Coldplay's Parachutes, and also "Best Rock Album" for Coldplay's Viva la Vida or Death and All His Friends. He has worked with artists such as Coldplay, The Rolling Stones, Prefab Sprout, Deacon Blue, James Brown, Aerosmith, Jeff Buckley, David Byrne, Tony Bennett, Billy Joel, Rod Stewart, Paul McCartney, Ben Folds, Pet Shop Boys, Bob Dylan, Willie Nelson, KT Tunstall, and Martha Wainwright.

Style 
Brauer is known for an unusual implementation of multi-bus compression, referred to as 'Brauerizing', in which various instrumental sections of a mix are sent to different compressors in an ABCD implementation, while vocals are usually sent to separate compressors in parallel. These are each adjusted for their own timbral and tonal quality, and are then blended by ear into the stereo mixbus to achieve the desired result.

Grammy Awards 
 Angélique Kidjo – Sings (Best World Music Album) 2016
 Angélique Kidjo – Eve (Best World Music Album) 2015
 Calle 13 – Multi Viral (Latin Grammy: Best Urban Music Album) 2015
 Calle 13 – Multi Viral (Best Latin Rock, Urban or Alternative Album)
 John Mayer – Battle Studies (Best Engineered Album, Non-Classical) 2011
 Coldplay – Viva la Vida or Death and All His Friends (Best Rock Album) 2009
 John Mayer – Continuum (Best Pop Vocal Album) 2007
 Coldplay – Parachutes (Best Alternative Album) 2000

References

External links 
 

American audio engineers
Grammy Award winners
Living people
Year of birth missing (living people)